Anthony Michael Teresa (December 8, 1933 – October 16, 1984) was a professional American football halfback in the National Football League (NFL) and the American Football League (AFL). He played one game for the NFL's San Francisco 49ers in 1958 and one season for the AFL's Oakland Raiders. 
He was the first person to score a touchdown (TD) for the Raiders franchise.
In the Raiders inaugural season, he led the team in rushing TDs, receiving TDs, and even threw a TD pass.
He also played quarterback in the Canadian Football League for the BC Lions in 1956 and 1957. He completed 35.8% of his 67 passes for 371 yards.

1933 births
1984 deaths
People from Pittsburg, California
Players of American football from California
American football running backs
Canadian football quarterbacks
American players of Canadian football
San Jose State Spartans football players
Sportspeople from the San Francisco Bay Area
BC Lions players
San Francisco 49ers players
Oakland Raiders players
American Football League players